Nottoway , also called Cheroenhaka, was a language spoken by the Nottoway people. Nottoway is closely related to Tuscarora within the Iroquoian language family. Two tribes of Nottoway are recognized by the state of Virginia: the Nottoway Indian Tribe of Virginia and the Cheroenhaka (Nottoway) Indian Tribe. Other Nottoway descendants live in Wisconsin and Canada, where some of their ancestors fled in the 18th century. The last known speaker, Edith Turner, died in 1838. The Nottoway people are undertaking work for language revival.

Knowledge of Nottoway comes primarily from a word list collected on March 4, 1820. Former President Thomas Jefferson’s handwritten letter to Peter S. Du Ponceau, on July 7, 1820, states that a Nottoway Indian vocabulary was obtained on March 4th, 1820 from Edith Turner, styled as their “Queen,” by John Wood, a former Professor of Mathematics at the College of William and Mary. Du Ponceau recognized the language immediately as Iroquoian, writing that he was "struck as well as astonished at its decided Iroquois Physiognomy." Blair A. Rudes (1981) concluded that Nottoway is a distinct language from Tuscarora, but closest to Tuscarora within Iroquoian.

In addition to the vocabulary collected by John Wood, a few additional words were gathered by James Trezvant.

Phonology

Vowels 

By comparing words in Wood’s vocabulary with cognates in other Iroquoian languages, Blair Rudes (1981) was able to reconstruct the phonemes of Nottoway. According to Rudes, Nottoway has five vowel phonemes as seen in the following table. These symbols, which Rudes uses in his transcriptions, are consistent with the International Phonetic Alphabet (IPA). Note that the mid central vowel is nasalized. 

Examples of these vowels are shown in the following table (from the Wood vocabulary). Wood's spelling of Nottoway was based on English and was therefore not systematic. A comparison to Tuscarora cognates in the rightmost column, however, provides evidence of Wood's intended vowel sound.

Consonants 
Nottoway has ten consonant phonemes, listed in the table below. Like the vowels, these consonant phonemes were reconstructed by Rudes using John Wood's vocabulary and knowledge of related languages. Most of the symbols that Rudes uses are the same as the IPA symbols. Where they differ, the IPA symbol is included in square brackets. The three labial consonants are in parentheses because these phonemes are only present in five words of the language, none of which are of Iroquoian descent. The letter ‘m’ also sometimes occurs at the end of a word after a vowel, but this is to indicate nasalization of the previous vowel, not the presence of the phoneme /m/.

The following table shows example words with each of these consonants (also from the Wood vocabulary).  Comparison to related languages (primarily Tuscarora) allowed Rudes to reconstruct some of the consonant phonemes (in bold).

Syllable structure 
The English-based spelling Wood used makes it difficult to determine syllable structure. Most words, however, are consistent with the syllable structure (C)V(C)(C):

An exception is words that begin with /kw/ (which may have been a complex segment):

There is also limited evidence that words could end in three consonants:

Consonant clusters must include /w/ or /s/, and possibly /n/. /w/ is the most common, but /s/ is still regularly seen in words like Whisk 'five'. The status of /n/ is uncertain since Wood used  to represent nasal vowels.

Aside from Whisk 'five', most content words are multisyllabic.

Grammar

Possessive prefixes 
Rudes (1981) notes that Nottoway has two series of pronominal prefixes used for inalienable and alienable possession. Inalienable nouns, such as body parts, are possessed with the prefix ge- 'my': ge-snunke 'my hand', ge-tunke 'my belly'. Alienable nouns are possessed with the prefix ak- 'my': ak-uhor '(my) old man', aqu-eianha '(my) boy'. These two series of pronominal prefixes are also used on verbs, where they indicate the agent and patient, respectively. The full set of prefixes is listed in the table below.

Other affixes 
In addition to the possessive prefixes, Rudes identifies a number of other affixes appearing in the Wood vocabulary. They are as follows:

Word order 

Most of the written Nottoway materials are vocabularies rather than texts, so scholars can only make limited assumptions about the syntactic structure of the language. However, Rudes (1981) explains three syntactic characteristics that are supported by recorded Nottoway evidence:

1. The definite article precedes a noun, as in Tuscarora.

2. Of two adjacent nouns, the first noun modifies the second.

3. An adjective follows the noun it modifies, and most likely could also precede it.

Rudes tentatively reconstructs noun incorporation based on these examples:

Vocabulary 
The following vocabulary is from Wood as cited in Rudes from the version Jefferson sent to Du Ponceau.

Nouns of the Universe

Of the Human Species

Of Animals

Division of Time

Domestic Articles

Adjectives

Numerals

Verbs

Other Words
Rudes attributes the following words to a vocabulary by J. N. B. Hewitt. It may be a later version of the one gathered by Trezvant.

References

Northern Iroquoian languages
Extinct languages of North America